Interest rate risk is the risk that arises for bond owners from fluctuating interest rates. How much interest rate risk a bond has depends on how sensitive its price is to interest rate changes in the market. The sensitivity depends on two things, the bond's time to maturity, and the coupon rate of the bond.

Calculation
Interest rate risk analysis is almost always based on simulating movements in one or more yield curves using the Heath-Jarrow-Morton framework to ensure that the yield curve movements are both consistent with current market yield curves and such that no riskless arbitrage is possible.  The Heath-Jarrow-Morton framework was developed in the early 1991 by David Heath of Cornell University, Andrew Morton of Lehman Brothers, and Robert A. Jarrow of Kamakura Corporation and Cornell University.

There are a number of standard calculations for measuring the impact of changing interest rates on a portfolio consisting of various assets and liabilities.  The most common techniques include:

 Marking to market, calculating the net market value of the assets and liabilities, sometimes called the "market value of portfolio equity"
 Stress testing this market value by shifting the yield curve in a specific way.
 Calculating the value at risk of the portfolio
 Calculating the multiperiod cash flow or financial accrual income and expense for N periods forward in a deterministic set of future yield curves
 Doing step 4 with random yield curve movements and measuring the probability distribution of cash flows and financial accrual income over time.
 Measuring the mismatch of the interest sensitivity gap of assets and liabilities, by classifying each asset and liability by the timing of interest rate reset or maturity, whichever comes first.
 Analyzing Duration, Convexity, DV01 and Key Rate Duration.

At banks
The assessment of interest rate risk is a very large topic at banks, thrifts, saving and loans, credit unions, and other finance companies, and among their regulators. The widely deployed CAMELS rating system assesses a financial institution's: Capital adequacy, Assets, Management Capability, Earnings, Liquidity, and Sensitivity to market risk. A large portion of the Sensitivity in CAMELS is interest rate risk. Much of what is known about assessing interest rate risk has been developed by the interaction of financial institutions with their regulators since the 1990s. Interest rate risk is unquestionably the largest part of the sensitivity analysis in the CAMELS system for most banking institutions. When a bank receives a bad CAMELS rating equity holders, bond holders and creditors are at risk of loss, senior managers can lose their jobs and the firms are put on the FDIC problem bank list.

See the Sensitivity section of the CAMELS rating system for a substantial list of links to documents and examiner manuals, issued by financial regulators, that cover many issues in the analysis of interest rate risk.

In addition to being subject to the CAMELS system, the largest banks are often subject to prescribed stress testing. The assessment of interest rate risk is typically informed by some type of stress testing. See: Stress test (financial), List of bank stress tests, List of systemically important banks.

References 

Market risk
Interest rates